Bless 'Em All is a 1948 British musical comedy film directed by Robert Jordan Hill and starring Hal Monty and Max Bygraves, the latter in his screen debut.

John Guillermin worked on the film as an associate producer.

Premise
The film is about three men who meet when they are called up for the Second World War and fight together in the Battle of France.

Cast
Hal Monty as Skimpy
Max Bygraves as Tommy
Jack Milroy as Jock

Production
It was the first of two Adelphi Films to star Hal Monty as Skimpy. It was also the debut of Max Bygraves.

Reception
The film appears to have been reasonably popular.

Preservation status
It is on the British Film Institute's 75 Most Wanted list of lost films; only a two-and-a-half minute trailer was known to survive at the time. However, a reader notified BFI that a cut-down version titled Be Kind Sergeant was being offered for sale on eBay.

Cast
Hal Monty as Skimpy
Max Bygraves as Tommy
Sybil Amiel as Lisette
Les Ritchie as Sergeant Willis
Stan White as Corporal
Pat Linova as Val
Jack Milroy as Jock
Peter Williams as Army doctor

References

External links
BFI 75 Most Wanted entry, with extensive notes

British musical comedy films
British black-and-white films
Military humor in film
British World War II films
1948 musical comedy films
1948 films
1940s rediscovered films
Rediscovered British films
1940s British films